The Woodland Farm–Leland House is a historic house in Sherborn, Massachusetts.  The oldest portion of this house, a three-bay section with chimney, was built c. 1705 by Hopestill Leland, and enlarged by the addition of a leanto to the rear c. 1715.  About 1760 it was widened to a full five bay width, and ells were added to either side c. 1820 and 1950.  The exterior has exhibits a variety of styles, with Federal and Italianate elements.  The house's original clapboards have been shingled over.

The house was listed on the National Register of Historic Places in 1986.

See also
National Register of Historic Places listings in Sherborn, Massachusetts

References

Houses on the National Register of Historic Places in Middlesex County, Massachusetts
Houses in Sherborn, Massachusetts
Georgian architecture in Massachusetts